Eric Stoddard (born 24 June 1975), is an automobile and industrial designer who has worked for DaimlerChrysler and Hyundai Kia Automotive Group.

Background
Stoddard was raised in Rochester, New York and is the son of a violinist for the Rochester Philharmonic Orchestra.

Early career
After graduating from the Cleveland Institute of Art in Cleveland, Ohio with a Bachelor of Fine Arts in Industrial Design, Eric worked as a designer at DaimlerChrysler from 1998 to 2002.

In 2002 he was recruited to work for Hyundai Motor Company in Irvine, California.  In 2008, Eric joined Hyundai in Korea.

DaimlerChrysler

While at the Chrysler Headquarters and Technology Center in Auburn Hills, Michigan, Eric worked under Don Renkert to design the Chrysler Crossfire Concept  released at the North American International Auto Show in 2001.  Eric went on to become the lead exterior designer of the production model of the Chrysler Crossfire under Andrew Dyson.

Eric was also the lead exterior designer on the Dodge SRT-4 as well as a contributing designer to the Chrysler Pacifica, 2003 Dodge Viper and Chrysler Sebring.

Hyundai

In 2002, Eric was recruited as a senior designer to Hyundai Kia Automotive Group in Irvine, California.  At Hyundai, under Design Chief Joel Piaskowski, Eric lead the exterior design of the Hyundai Genesis Coupe Concept unveiled at the 2007 LA Auto Show, the Production 2010 Hyundai Genesis Coupe, the HCD-9 Talus Concept, the 2007 Hyundai Elantra and KCD-1 Slice Concept.

Awards
Eric Stoddard is the recipient of a Red Dot Design Award in 2009 for a bicycle design concept called the Zoomla and was a finalist for the 2010 Taipei Cycle Show for his bicycle entry the AutoVelo.

References

American automobile designers
Chrysler designers
People in the automobile industry
Hyundai Motor Group
DaimlerChrysler
Living people
1975 births